Megalapalya is a small village in Magadi taluk, Ramanagara district (Before 2010 it was Bengaluru rural district), Karnataka, India.
This village is having only 50 Houses and Only Vokkaliga's live.
This village is located on Bengaluru- Mangaluru National Highway NH48 and it is 50 km from Bengaluru. Goddess Palekamma is bless matha of this village. IAS officer Dr.Venkatesh M V was born and grown from here. Politician Ex-Zilla Panchayati President Dr. B V HAMSAKUMARI is a daughter in law of this village.

Cities and towns in Bangalore Rural district